Airport T2 is both a Rodalies de Catalunya commuter rail station and a Barcelona Metro station serving terminal complex T2 of Barcelona–El Prat Airport. They are located adjacent to the airport's terminal T2B, in the municipality of El Prat de Llobregat, to the southwest of Barcelona, in Catalonia, Spain. The Rodalies de Catalunya station is the southern terminus of the current rail link coming from El Prat de Llobregat railway station. It is operated by Renfe Operadora and is served by Barcelona commuter rail service line . The metro station is on the airport branch of Barcelona Metro line 9 (L9) and is operated by Transports Metropolitans de Barcelona (TMB).

Opened in 1975, the current Rodalies de Catalunya station is the only commuter rail station serving the airport, so that it is simply known as Airport. Besides, it is due to disappear around 2022 with the construction of a new airport rail link, which will also reach airport terminal T1. The Barcelona Metro line 9 station started operating in 2016, when the line's  portion between the airport terminals and Zona Universitària station in western Barcelona opened for passenger service as the L9 Sud ("South").

Location
Both the Rodalies de Catalunya and the Barcelona Metro stations are located right in front of airport terminal T2B, to which it is connected by an elevated walkway crossing over a parking lot and a road serving terminal complex T2. The Rodalies station is located at-grade, whilst the metro station lies underground, parallel to it. Terminals T2A and T2C can be accessed on foot through terminal T2B. The shuttle bus service runs 24 hours a day with a service pattern of 4 minutes (8:00–20:00), 7 minutes (20:00–0:00) or 20 minutes (00:00–5:00), and has stops in front of terminals T2B and T2C as well as both the arrival and departure areas of terminal T1.

History

Commuter rail link
At the time it started operating, the airport station was served half-hourly by non-stopping shuttle services to Barcelona Sants, with a journey time of 14 minutes. This was therefore the first airport rail link in Spain and one of the earliest such airport rail links in the world.

On , with the dismantling of the former route of the Barcelona–Mataró–Maçanet-Massanes railway through the Barcelona neighborhood of Poblenou, the airport station began to serve as the southern terminus of all commuter rail services running from Mataró. All those trains used the Meridiana Tunnel in central Barcelona, calling at Sants and Plaça de Catalunya stations, with an initial service frequency of 30 minutes in each direction.

Due to the construction works of the Madrid–Barcelona high-speed rail line in Barcelona's southern accesses, the services between Mataró and the airport station were suspended on 4 December 2005 and replaced with shuttle trains between the airport and El Prat de Llobregat railway station. On , a new Rodalies Barcelona line numbered 10 (or R10, with the current Rodalies de Catalunya designation) dedicated to serving the airport started operating. With a service frequency of 30 minutes in each direction, the new line ran between the airport station and Barcelona's Estació de França, using the Aragó Tunnel in central Barcelona, calling at Sants and Passeig de Gràcia stations.

Due to construction works near Sant Andreu Comtal railway station in Barcelona, a "temporary" restructuring affecting lines R2 and R10 was implemented on : the R10 was suspended and the R2 was divided into three different lines—R2, R2 Nord ("North") and R2 Sud ("South")—. Thus, line R2 Nord started operating at the airport station, originating the current line scheme. The R10 was initially scheduled to resume services two years later.

Barcelona Metro
At that moment, the airport branch of Barcelona Metro line 9 was expected to open for passenger service in 2012. In March 2012, the Government of Catalonia announced the opening date of the line's section between Airport T1 and  stations was to be delayed until 2014, after passing a modification on the funding of several sections of the L9 in order to prioritize the arrival of the metro line at the airport. In June 2014, the government announced that the Airport T1–Zona Universitària section, excepting ,  and  stations, would open in the first six months of 2016. The first day of passenger service was 12 February 2016.

Rail services

The Rodalies de Catalunya station is served half-hourly by Barcelona commuter rail service line . Typical weekday services usually run between the airport and Maçanet-Massanes or Sant Celoni stations, via Barcelona. However, there also exist some services between the airport and Granollers Centre railway station, specially during the weekend. All trains call at Barcelona Sants—the city's main station—and Barcelona Passeig de Gràcia—the line's station serving central Barcelona—, with an average journey time of 19 and 26 minutes, respectively.

Additional partial services may be added if necessary, reducing the frequency to 4 minutes.

Fares

Airport T2 station belongs to different fare zones depending on the entity issuing the tickets. On the one hand, Rodalies de Catalunya has its own fare zone system and considers the station to be in fare zone 4 of its Barcelona commuter rail service, so that a single ticket to Barcelona (or the other way around) costs €4.1. On the other hand, the Autoritat del Transport Metropolità (ATM)—a public agency in charge of coordinating public transport operators in the Barcelona area—considers it to be in fare zone 1, in the same way as the transport stations located in the city of Barcelona and its adjacent municipalities. Thus, the price of a journey between Barcelona and the airport varies significantly due to the fact that, in the case of Rodalies de Catalunya, four fare zones are crossed, though, in the case of the ATM, only one fare zone is crossed.

Although Transports Metropolitans de Barcelona (TMB), the operator of the Barcelona Metro station, uses the ATM fare zone system, the basic single ticket issued by the company is not valid at this station, and the passengers using the metro stations located at the airport terminals are required to buy a special ticket known as an airport ticket. This ticket costs €4.5 and gives access to the rest of the TMB-operated Barcelona Metro system. In contrast, all multiple-time tickets and unlimited passes issued by the ATM are valid at this station, with the exception of the T-10 ten-trip ticket.

Future

Construction works for a new, double-track rail link for Barcelona–El Prat Airport started in July 2015, with a completion date around 2022, delayed from the original 2018 completion year. The new rail link will commence at El Prat de Llobregat railway station and will have stations at both airport terminals T1 and T2 thanks to the construction of a  tunnel underneath one of the airport runways, replacing the current single-track line and the Rodalies de Catalunya station serving the airport. The new rail link will allow an increased service frequency of 15 minutes in each direction on commuter rail services to central Barcelona.

References

External links

 Aeroport  listing at the Rodalies de Catalunya website
 Aeroport T2 listing at the Transports Metropolitans de Barcelona (TMB) website
 Information and photos of the Rodalies de Catalunya and Barcelona Metro stations at trenscat.cat 
 Video on train operations at the Rodalies de Catalunya station on YouTube

Railway stations in Spain opened in 2016
Airport railway stations in Spain
Barcelona Metro line 9 stations
Railway stations in El Prat de Llobregat
Railway stations in Spain opened in 1975
Rodalies de Catalunya stations